Bartolomeo della Gatta (1448–1502), born Pietro di Antonio Dei, was an Italian (Florentine) painter, illuminator, and architect.  He was the son of a goldsmith. He was a colleague of Fra Bartolommeo. In 1468, Bartolomeo became a monk in the Order of Camaldoli, which his brother Nicolo had already entered. Upon taking holy orders, he changed his name to Bartolomeo. About 1481, he was summoned to Rome where he contributed to the cycle of frescos on the walls of the Sistine Chapel. He collaborated with Luca Signorelli.
Bartolomeo eventually became abbot of the abbey of San Clemente in Arezzo. He died in 1502 and was buried in the abbey of San Clemente.

References
 Martini, Alberto, The Early Work of Bartolomeo della Gatta, The Art Bulletin, Vol. 42, No. 2 (Jun., 1960), 133–141.
 Vasari, Giorgio, Le Vite delle più eccellenti pittori, scultori, ed architettori, many editions and translations.

1448 births
1502 deaths
15th-century Italian painters
Italian male painters
16th-century Italian painters
Painters from Florence
Renaissance painters
15th-century Italian architects
Camaldolese Order
Catholic painters